Borgholm Municipality (Borgholms kommun) is a municipality in Kalmar County, south-eastern Sweden, constituting the northern half of the island of Öland in the Baltic Sea. The municipal seat is located in the city of Borgholm.

Notable historic sites in this municipality are Borgholm Castle and Halltorps Estate.

The local government reform in the 1970s saw the creation of two municipalities on the island of Öland. Borgholm Municipality is the northern of the two and consists of sixteen original (pre-1952) entities. The southern half of the island is made up of Mörbylånga Municipality.

Localities
There are 5 urban areas (also called Tätort or localities) in Borgholm Municipality.

In the table the localities are listed according to the size of the population as of December 31, 2005. The municipal seat is in bold characters.

Sister cities
Borgholm has four sister cities (a.k.a. twin towns):

Rockford, Illinois, U.S.
Łeba, Poland
Zelenogradsk, Kaliningrad, Russia
Korsnäs, Finland

Politics

Riksdag
These are the results of the elections to the Riksdag held in Borgholm since the first election after the municipal reform that was held in 1973. The results only include parties that have won representation in the Riksdag assembly at least once during this timeframe. The results of the Sweden Democrats were not listed at a municipal level by the SCB between 1988 and 1998 due to the party's small size at the time.

Blocs

This lists the relative strength of the socialist and centre-right blocs since 1973, but parties not elected to the Riksdag are inserted as "other", including the Sweden Democrats results from 1988 to 2006, but also the Christian Democrats pre-1991 and the Greens in 1982, 1985 and 1991. The sources are identical to the table above. The coalition or government mandate marked in bold formed the government after the election. New Democracy got elected in 1991 but are still listed as "other" due to the short lifespan of the party. "Elected" is the total number of percentage points from the municipality that went to parties who were elected to the Riksdag.

References
Statistics Sweden

External links

Borgholm Municipality - Official site

 
Municipalities of Kalmar County